The Prince of Wales Island, or Muralag, is an island of the Torres Strait Islands archipelago at the tip of Cape York Peninsula within the Endeavour Strait of Torres Strait in Queensland, Australia. It is within the locality of Prince Of Wales within the Shire of Torres.

Most of the land has been returned to the Kaurareg people, who are the traditional residents on the island.

Geography

Being inhabited only by a few Kaurareg families (population 20 in 2001), it is very sparsely populated. The town in the north of the island is called Muralug, after the native name of the island.

History
First recorded sighting by Europeans of Prince of Wales Island was by the Spanish expedition of Luís Vaez de Torres on 3 October 1606.

The ship Sperwer was shipwrecked in 1869. In November 1869, the police magistrate at Somerset, Frank Jardine,  discovered the bodies of the captain and crew of the Sperwer hanging on trees "horribly mutilated". The removal of the heads and clothing prevented identification of the victims. A massacre of Kaurareg people occurred on Muralag and Wednesday Island in 1869 and punishments continued for years, decimating the population of Kaurareg people.

Sometime between 1885 and 1895 there was what was called the Danish Settlement on Prince of Wales Island, "just opposite the Government residency" on Thursday Island.  About the same time a pearling station existed on the island, with four boats attached.

In 2019, the Torres Shire Council decided to construct a harbour for the island on a site the Kuarareg people claimed to be of vital historical importance. The Kuarareg opposed the plan and obtained a landmark injunction, grounded in native title, barring future projects.  The council abandoned its plans.

Language 
The island's native name is Muralag. The indigenous language of the Thursday Island group is Kaiwaligau Ya, also known as Kauraraigau Ya (the name in the form of the dialect of the 1800s) [also recorded as Kaurareg and Kowrareg]. Kaiwalaig (Kauraraig) means "islander", and Kaiwaligau Ya (Kauraraigau Ya) means "islanders' language". Kaiwaligau Ya is one of the four dialects of Kala Lagaw Ya, spoken throughout Torres Strait except for the Eastern Islands, where Meriam Mìr is spoken. Most Kowrareg now use Brokan (Torres Strait Creole) for everyday communication, though the dialect still has many good mother-tongue speakers.

Education 
There are no schools on the island. The nearest primary and secondary schools are on Thursday Island.

See also 

 List of Torres Strait Islands
 Kala Lagaw Ya
 Charles Eaton (1833 ship)

References

External links 

 Page of the Council relating to Prince of Wales Island

Torres Strait Islands
Torres Strait Islands communities
Shire of Torres